Perth & Tattersalls Bowling and Recreation Club is a bowling club based in East Perth, Western Australia. The club was formed from an amalgamation of the Perth Bowling and Recreation Club and the Western Australian Tattersalls Club in the 1970s. It is the oldest bowling club in Perth, Western Australia.

History

Perth Bowling and Recreation Club
The Perth Bowling Club was formed in 1895, becoming the first bowling club in Perth. The club began playing on greens on the Perth Esplanade in 1896. The greens were officially opened in April 1896 by club president John Forrest, the Premier of Western Australia.

Western Australian Tattersalls Club
Several attempts were made in the 1880s and 1890s were made to start up a Tattersalls Club in Perth before the Western Australian Tattersalls Club was established in 1901, with the Club formally registered as a company in 1903.

Merger
The two clubs agreed to merge in late 1978, with an act of parliament required to approve the merger.

Venues
Soon after the bowling club was founded, work began on building a facility to the north of the Perth Esplanade.

As time went on, with the widening of Riverside Drive and the ongoing reclamation of the Swan River, a move east of the Esplanade began to be suggested.

During the 1960s, the club took over facilities on Plain Street, East Perth that had originally been built for the 1962 Commonwealth Games, but not used.

References

External links
 
 

1895 establishments in Australia
Sports clubs established in 1895
Bowls in Australia
Sporting clubs in Perth, Western Australia
Bowls clubs